Darrell Maurice Nelson (born October 27, 1961) is a former American football tight end in the National Football League who played for the Pittsburgh Steelers. He played college football for the Memphis Tigers.

References

1961 births
Living people
American football tight ends
Pittsburgh Steelers players
Memphis Tigers football players